Harish Kalyan (born 29 June 1990) is an Indian actor who works predominantly in Tamil films. His acting debut was in 2010 in Sindhu Samaveli, before being noticed for his performances in Poriyaalan (2014), Vil Ambu (2016) and Pyaar Prema Kaadhal (2018).

Film career

Career beginnings (2010–2017)
Harish Kalyan made his debut in Samy's controversial Sindhu Samaveli (2010), portraying the role of Anbu, whose wife has an illicit relationship with her father-in-law. Upon release, the film met with contrasting reviews, whilst some critics refused to give the film a rating, declaring their disgust at the film's plot. Critics described his next role in the Thaman-musical Aridhu Aridhu (2010) as "okay", but the film also failed to take a strong opening at the box office. Harish then went on to work in S. A. Chandrasekhar's Sattapadi Kutram (2011), which featured Sathyaraj, Vikranth and Bhanu in other roles. The film showcased the changes our legal system demands, with Harish playing a spoilt brat who eventually turns over a new leaf in the film. The film opened to poor reviews and did poorly at the box office. He was next seen alongside Karunas, Shweta Basu Prasad and Sanjana Singh in the 2013 comedy film Chandhamama, before playing a supporting role in the Telugu film, Jai Sriram (2013). During the period, he also worked on a bilingual film titled Guest opposite Poonam Kaur, but the film did not have a theatrical release.

After half a dozen films, he was finally noticed for his performance in the thriller Poriyaalan (2014), where he portrayed a young civil engineer aspiring to become a property developer caught up in a real estate scam. Produced by Vetrimaaran and featuring him alongside Anandhi, Poriyaalan became Harish's first successful venture with critics praising his performance. The success of Poriyaalan prompted film maker Suseenthiran to select Harish to portray a leading role in his production, Vil Ambu (2016). Appearing in an ensemble cast including his own father Kalyan, Sri and Chandini Tamilarasan, critics praised Harish's performance stating he "scores big time" and "is bound to be noticed for his charming looks and clean features". Despite winning positive reviews, the film did middling business at the box office. In 2017, Harish appeared in another Telugu film, the romantic comedy Kaadhali, where he featured alongside Sai Ronak and Pooja Doshi. A critic praised his performance saying that he "plays his part with maturity".

Breakthrough (2018–present)
In 2017, Harish took part in the first season of the Tamil reality television show, Bigg Boss hosted by Kamal Haasan. He entered the show on day 53 as a new contestant and finished as the show's second runner up. Following his successful appearance on the show, Harish Kalyan was signed on to play the lead role in Elan's romantic comedy Pyaar Prema Kaadhal (2018), which featured him opposite fellow Bigg Boss contestant Raiza Wilson. Portraying Sree Kumar, a naive Chennai-based IT worker, he won positive reviews for his portrayal as the film received critical and commercial acclaim upon release. A critic from the Indian Express wrote Harish "comes up with a performance that he can be proud of", while the Deccan Chronicle also praised the lead pair, noting Harish "looks good and plays his boy-next-door character with utmost ease", while "his flair for comedy also comes to the fore".

In 2019, Harish Kalyan starred as a middle-class boy with major anger issues and a troubled childhood in Ispade Rajavum Idhaya Raniyum directed by Ranjit Jayakodi. Critic from The Times of India found that "Harish Kalyan excels as the aggressive and possessive youngster, a character which is quite contrasting to the one he essayed in Pyaar Prema Kaadhal”. Having played the boy next door in his earlier films, Kalyan had to step out of his comfort zone to prepare for Gautham's role. Besides gaining weight, he grew a beard for his rugged look. The film received both critical acclaim and wide audience response. His film Dhanusu Raasi Neyargale (2019) with Sanjay Bharathi, son of director Santhana Bharathi, was a comedy-drama with a lead male character who is highly superstitious. He played the role of a staunch believer in josiyam and jadhagam. Harish won positive critical acclaim for his performance as Prabhu Govind in the movie Dharala Prabhu (2020), which is the Tamil adapted version of 2012 Hindi film Vicky donor. Directed by the debutant Krishna Marimuthu, the film opened to positive reviews. He was also roped in to play one of the lead in Chimbu Deven's interesting entertainer titled Kasada Thapara (2021) which is produced by Venkat Prabhu's Black Ticket Company. Besides, Harish played the lead role in Oh Manapenne (2021), the Tamil remake of the 2016 Telugu film Pelli Choopulu. He will next play the lead in the movie Let’s Get Married, produced by M.S.Dhoni owned Dhoni Entertainments.

Other work
Harish Kalyan learned Hindustani music and can also play the keyboard. During January 2012, he announced his intentions of releasing two songs he had worked on titled "Kutty Peg – A Toast to Life" and "Ovvoru Manushanuukum Ovvoru Feelings". In 2016, Harish released an independent song titled "I'm Single", working as a singer and lyricist for the song, which had music composed by L. V. Muthukumarasamy.

Personal life 
His father, Five Star Kalyan, is a film distributor and music label owner. He portrayed Harish Kalyan's father in Vil Ambu (2016). In October 2022, Harish Kalyan married Narmada Udayakumar.

Filmography

Television

Discography

Awards and honours

References

External links

Indian male film actors
Living people
1990 births
Tamil male actors
Male actors in Tamil cinema
Bigg Boss (Tamil TV series) contestants